Amy Jephta is a South African playwright, screenwriter and theatre director. Works include Kristalvlakte, Ellen: The Ellen Pakkies Story, Other People's Lives, Sonskyn Beperk, and While You Weren't Looking. She is a lecturer at the University of Cape Town and the first recipient of the Emerging Theatre Director's Bursary in South Africa. Her work has been staged at The Fugard Theatre, The Bush Theatre, The Royal Court Theatre, Jermyn Street Theatre, Theatre503 and the Edinburgh International Festival. Jephta is an alumnus of the Lincoln Center Theatre Directors Lab and was one of the Mail & Guardian 200 Young South Africans in 2013. Her monologue Shoes was performed by James McAvoy and directed by Danny Boyle as part of the 2015 show The Children's Monologues at The Royal Court Theatre.
She has been a storyliner and scriptwriter on the drama series, Nkululeko, a coming-of-age story set in Khayelitsha for South Africa's Mzansi Magic Channel. Amy also lends her writing expertise to Cape Town-based soap opera, Suidooster, as a story-liner and scriptwriter.

Amy is the winner of the 2017 Eugene Marais prize for Drama, the 2019 Standard Bank Young Artist award for Theatre  and an alumnus of Ron Howard and Brian Grazer's Imagine Entertainment Impact Lab

Education 

 BA in Theatre and Performance at the University of Cape Town
 MA in Theatre-making at the University of Cape Town

Plays 

 This Liquid Earth: A Eulogy in Verse 
 Kristalvlakte
 Other People's Lives 
 All Who Pass 
 Flight Lessons
 Free Falling Bird 
 Damage Control 
 Kitchen
 Interiors
 Pornography

Films & Television 

 While You Weren't Looking (co-writer)
Soldaat (screenwriter/director) 
 Ellen, The Ellen Pakkies Story (screenwriter) 
 Trackers (screenwriter) 
 Sonskyn Beperk (screenwriter)

Publications 

 Kristalvlakte (Tafelberg Publishers)
 Other People's Lives (Junkets Publishers)
 Contemporary Plays by African Women (editor)

References 

 Malan, Robin, et al. "SA gay plays 2: an anthology of plays, 1994-2013." (2013).
 Jephta, Amy. "On familiar roads: The fluidity of Cape coloured experiences and expressions of migration and reclamation in the performances of the Kaapse Klopse in Cape Town." Performing Migrancy and Mobility in Africa. Palgrave Macmillan UK, 2015. 164–179.

External links 

 Amy Jephta at the Internet Movie Database 
 Interview with Amy Jephta on News24
 Amy Jephta on Expresso Morning Show

Year of birth missing (living people)
Living people
South African dramatists and playwrights
South African writers
South African theatre directors
South African screenwriters
University of Cape Town alumni